International Fashion Academy Pakistan (abbreviated as IFAP) is a private fashion industry school based in Lahore, Pakistan.

History 
The school's chairperson is fashion model Mehreen Syed, who founded the institution in 2011. Its launching ceremony was held at Royal Palm Golf and Country Club.

Faculty 
Ather Shahzad is the Head of Faculty and Hassan Sheheryar Yasin is the Head of Visiting Faculty.

References

External links 
 

Fashion schools in Pakistan
Universities and colleges in Lahore
Educational institutions established in 2011
2011 establishments in Pakistan